The 2019 Southeast Asian Games, officially known as the 30th Southeast Asian Games, or the 30th SEA Games, and commonly known as Philippines 2019, was the 30th edition of the Southeast Asian Games, a biennial regional multi-sport event which was held in the Philippines from 30 November to 11 December 2019. However, due to a narrow calendar, some sports started before the opening ceremony as early as November 24.

This edition was marked by the first major decentralization in the history of the Games, with competition venues spread in 23 cities across the country and divided into four clusters; all were located on the island of Luzon (Metro Manila, Clark, Subic/Olongapo, and a fourth cluster consisting of standalone venues in Cavite, Laguna, and La Union). This was the country's fourth time to host the games, and its first since 2005. Previously, it had also hosted the 1981 and 1991 editions of the games. This edition was most notable for being the first edition to include esports, obstacle course race, kurash, sambo, underwater hockey, breaking, surfing, modern pentathlon, jiu-jitsu, kickboxing, and skateboarding; as well as having the highest number of sports in the history of the games, at a total of 56.

The hosting rights were originally awarded to Brunei in 2012, but the country pulled out days before the 2015 Southeast Asian Games due to "financial and logistical reasons."

The Philippines was previously slated to host 2023 Southeast Asian Games but, in July 2015, it agreed to host the Games after Brunei's withdrawal (with Cambodia taking its place for 2023). However, the Philippines' hosting was left uncertain following the withdrawal of government support two years later as it planned to use the funds intended for the games for the rehabilitation of Marawi after being occupied by ISIS supporters. Thailand and Indonesia offered to host the games with the latter planning to reuse the venues used for the 2018 Asian Games. However, by August 16, 2017, the Philippine government announced the reversal of the withdrawal.

The host country, Philippines, emerged in the medal tally as the overall champion for the first time in 14 years, breaking its own medal count record in 2005, followed by Vietnam and Thailand. Several games and national records were broken during the games. Amidst numerous controversies and problems, the games were deemed generally successful with the rising standard of competition amongst the Southeast Asian nations; with its hosting being lauded by the Olympic Council of Asia for its facilities and hospitality. The Philippines is bidding to host the 2030 Asian Games, but was unable to submit the bid by the dateline.

Quah Zheng Wen of Singapore was awarded the Most Valuable Player (MVP) award for male athletes, having won six golds and two silvers, while Nguyễn Thị Ánh Viên of Vietnam, with the same medal tally, was accorded MVP honors for female athletes. The fairplay award was awarded to Roger Casugay for saving a fellow competitor's life.

Host selection 
As per SEA Games traditions, hosting duties are rotated among the SEA Games Federation (SEAGF) member countries. Each country is assigned to host the event in a predetermined year, but the country could choose to withdraw or not host that edition.

In July 2012, the SEAGF meeting in Myanmar confirmed that Malaysia would host the regional biennial event in 2017, should there be no other country willing to bid for the games. Olympic Council of Malaysia (OCM) secretary general Sieh Kok Chi, who attended the meeting, said that Myanmar would host the Games in 2013, followed by Singapore in 2015 and Brunei in 2017. However, the sultanate gave up hosting the Games in 2017, in exchange for having more time to organize the 2019 edition. Brunei hosted the Games only once in 1999 and planned to upgrade its sports facilities and build a new national stadium in Salambigar to accommodate the Games. However, on June 4, 2015, Brunei withdrew its hosting rights at the meeting in Singapore after the said country's Ministry of Culture, Youth and Sports had failed to give support for the Games due to the lack of sporting facilities, accommodation, and preparation of their athletes.

Philippines 

With Brunei's withdrawal, the Philippines had expressed its interest to host the Games Vietnam, the 2021 Southeast Asian Games host, was also offered to host this edition, but declined. On July 10, 2015, the Philippine Olympic Committee (POC) announced that the Philippines will be hosting the Games. Davao City and Manila were touted as the top candidates for the main host city of the Games. Cebu City and Albay also expressed interest in hosting some events.

On July 21, 2017, The Philippine Sports Commission (PSC) addressed the POC that it is withdrawing its support for the Philippine hosting of the 2019 Games, saying that government decided to reallocate funds meant for hosting to the rehabilitation efforts of Marawi, which was left devastated following the Battle of Marawi and it was later reported that the POC's insistence on handling all matters of the hosting; finance, security and the conduct of the Games as it did for the 2005 Southeast Asian Games led to the PSC's withdrawal of support.

However, in August 2017, the Philippines, through the then-POC president Peping Cojuangco, confirmed that the country will be hosting the 2019 SEA Games, after Cojuangco wrote to then-President Rodrigo Duterte and appealed for reconsideration.

Cojuangco has stated that the Games would be held in the Central Luzon area, particularly in the provinces of Bulacan, Pampanga, and Zambales. He added that the Philippine Arena in the municipality of Bocaue in Bulacan province would "most likely" be used in the Games. In January 2018, during the groundbreaking of the New Clark City Sports Hub (then known as the Philippine Sports City), it was announced that the organizers will attempt to hold all events of the games outside of Manila with New Clark City in Capas, Tarlac, Subic, and Bulacan as main host localities.

Handover ceremony
During the closing ceremony of the 2017 SEA Games in Kuala Lumpur, the symbolic SEA Games Federation council flag was handed over by outgoing Malaysian Olympic Committee president HRH Tunku Tan Sri Imran to then-Philippine Olympic Committee (POC) president Jose "Peping" Cojuangco, who in turn passed the flag to then-Foreign Affairs Secretary Alan Peter Cayetano, who will be the Chairman of organizing committee for 2019 games.

In contrast of other closing ceremonies held throughout the SEA Games, only a discrete video promoting tourism in the Philippines was presented instead of a grand presentation for the next host country. Another reason is to give focus on the celebration of the 60th anniversary of the establishment of the Malaysian federation.

Development and preparations

Unlike the 2005 games, the 2019 SEA Games adopted a different organizing structure for the Philippine Southeast Asian Games Organizing Committee (PHISGOC). According to Philippine Sports Commission chairman William Ramirez, Foreign Affairs Secretary (later House Speaker) Alan Peter Cayetano would be appointed as the organizing committee chairman, instead of the Philippine Olympic Committee president who presumed the role in 2005. Senator Juan Miguel Zubiri was initially the head of the organizing committee before being replaced by Cayetano.

At least three meetings were held for the preparation of the games. The first meeting was held in Shangri-la Hotel at the Fort on May 16 and 17, 2018. Another meeting was held on November 23 and 24, 2018.

Officials of National Sports Associations of the Philippines were designated as competition managers and were tasked to deal with local arrangements concerning their sport including logistics, venues and equipment.

Costs
The budget for the games is at least  (US$147 million as of July 31, 2019). (US$118 million) were provided by the government while the rest were secured by PHISGOC from sponsorship agreements. The government funds were allocated to the Philippine Sports Commission with (US$98 million) from the funds approved by the Philippine Congress and the remainder derived from augmentation fund approved by then-President Rodrigo Duterte. Duterte approved the additional funds by May 2019.

Ticketing
The organizers entered negotiations with SM Tickets for ticketing systems. All tickets for all events were originally planned to cost a fee, with sports determined to be less popular by the organizers, to have a minimal fee. On October 3, 2019, tickets for the opening ceremony and select events were made on available on all SM Tickets branches and online. However, in a few days leading to the opening ceremony, there were clamors to make the tickets free to the general public. Public figures and groups, such as the Samahang Weightlifting ng Pilipinas President Monico Puentevella and the Associated Labor Unions-Trade Union Congress of the Philippines appealed to then-President Rodrigo Duterte to make the tickets free. Presidential spokesperson Salvador Panelo suggested the organizers to give the tickets free or charge tickets at a discounted price for students.

On November 29, 2019, upon instructions of then-President Duterte, tickets were made available for free for all sporting events, except basketball, football and volleyball, which were sold out. Tickets were also made available for free for the closing ceremony, with organizers giving 10,000 tickets to SM Tickets for distribution and thousands of other tickets to local government units.

Transportation
Organizers coordinated with the Department of Transportation regarding logistics for the games including the possible closure of the North Luzon Expressway to the public for 12 hours before the opening ceremony.

Vehicles, including 362 public buses, 162 sedans and 100 VIP cars, were planned to be bought and 268 vans were to be rented for use for the regional games. There were also three self-driving electric vehicles will be provided by American firm Connected Autonomous Shared Transportation (COAST) for transportation of passengers in New Clark City at no cost to the government.

Volunteers
The organizers of the games launched a volunteer program in April 2019 in Taguig to aid the organization of the 2019 Southeast Asian Games with the target of volunteers initially set to 12,000. Around 9,000 individuals were recruited among those 20,686 people who expressed interest to join the volunteering program, 14,683 of which applied through official online portals. 2,960 applicants were foreigners while 6,003 were elected by educational institutions. There were approximately 2,250 volunteers in the Clark cluster, 1,980 in the Subic cluster, 3,150 in Metro Manila, and 1,620 in other venues not part of the first three clusters.

Medals
The official medals for the 2019 Southeast Asian Games were designed by Filipino metal sculptor Daniel dela Cruz, who also designed the SEA Games torch, incorporating elements inspired by the Philippines. On the medal's front, above the SEA Games logo is a sail or "layag" typically used by Filipino boats. Encircling the logo are sea waves signifying the Philippine archipelago. At the back is a rendering of the sports facilities at the New Clark City, site of the SEA Games, which was incorporated using high density etching. Symbols of the various sports are embedded using laser etching.

The gold medal is made of 24-karat gold plated material and its wave design in front is made of rhodium via bi-plating. The bronze medal was made "rose gold" in color instead of the traditional brown hue. The ribbon used to hold the medal features a double-sided design; one side features the colors associated with the Southeast Asian Games and the other is decorated with traditional Filipino weave patterns. They were accompanied by a wooden carrying box, while medalists also received flower bouquets, Pami and Philippine Airlines aircraft stuffed toys.

Torch

The design of the official torch for the games was designed by Filipino metal sculptor Daniel dela Cruz The torch was inspired from the sampaguita (Jasminum sambac) the Philippines' national flower and the hammered portions of the object represents the rays of the Philippine flag's sun. According to the organizers, the sun symbolizes "unity, sovereignty, social equality, and independence" aside from sharing the same symbolism of the sun of the Philippine flag. The torch weighs about 1.5 kilograms, not too heavy for the torch bearer. The torch was officially unveiled on August 23, 2019, at the Philippine International Convention Center in Pasay during the 100-day countdown to the games.

Torch relay
Preceding the torch run in the Philippines was the ceremonial lighting of the lantern at the Bukit Jalil National Stadium in Kuala Lumpur on October 3, 2019. During the ceremony, Malaysian authorities handed the torch to the Philippine authorities. During the ceremony, the flame was placed on a special lantern and was brought to Davao City to start the domestic part of the relay across the nation.

The Philippine part of the relay, started in front of SM Lanang in Davao City on October 30, 2019. The second leg of the run, participated by 6,500 runners was held at Cebu South Coastal Road in Cebu City on November 16, 2019. The final leg was held on November 23, 2019, at the Bayanihan Park in Clark Freeport Zone in Pampanga.

Cauldron

The inside is a hollow space filled with gravel, Inside the cauldron, there is an open space, which is filled with gravel, being supported by several metal structures on each side of the structure.

The cauldron was designed by National Artist for Architecture, Francisco Mañosa, which was his last project prior to his death.

Venues

There were four designated clusters or hubs for the sporting events of the 2019 Southeast Asian Games namely Clark, Subic, Metro Manila, and "Other Areas". Previously the fourth cluster was reportedly known as the BLT (Batangas, La Union, and Tagaytay) Cluster The main hub is Clark in the sports complex at the National Government Administrative Center, New Clark City in Capas, Tarlac. The secondary venue will be Subic while the tertiary venue will be Metro Manila and the other nearby areas. The Philippine Sports Commission confirmed that Manila would host boxing, basketball, and volleyball events while Subic would host water sport events.

The NOC (National Olympic Committee) mansions and villas for accommodating of the delegates from the competing countries were built in New Clark City. Each mansion would have 15 to 17 rooms each.

The opening ceremony was held at the Philippine Arena in Bulacan while the closing ceremony was held at the New Clark City Athletics Stadium.

Competition venues

Clark cluster

Metro Manila cluster

Subic cluster

Other areas

Non-competition venues

Marketing

Official launch and branding

The official launch and countdown ceremony of the 2019 Southeast Asian Games was made at the Bayanihan Park at the Clark Freeport Zone in Pampanga on November 30, 2018 which was attended by representatives of the 11 participating countries of the Games. At the ceremony the logo and theme of the Games were officially unveiled. A  structure consisting of 11 rings representing the 11 nations was also lit up as part of the countdown ceremony. The mascot was shortly confirmed as official outside the countdown ceremony rites.

Motto

The official motto of 2019 Southeast Asian Games as well as its theme is "We Win as One."

Logo
A preview of the logo of the 2019 SEA Games was earlier presented in front of the Olympic Council of Asia on August 20, 2018, in Jakarta, Indonesia during the 2018 Asian Games. The official logo depicts 11 rings from the logo of the Southeast Asian Games Federation forming the shape of the Philippines and colored with the red, blue, dark blue, yellow, and green. It was made official during the launching ceremony in Bayanihan Park on November 30, 2018. Public reception of the logo in the host country was mixed, with critics stating that the logo lacked creativity and design interest.

Mascot

Pami, with their name derived from the "pamilya", the Filipino word for "family", is the official mascot of the games. According to 2019 SEA Games executive director Ramon Suzara, the mascot represents every nation, every athlete, every person coming together that support each other at the games. The mascot with a joyful character has been described to have been made from squishy spherical balls. Just like the logo and theme, it was also previewed during the meeting in Jakarta, Indonesia. It was made official during the countdown ceremony in Bayanihan Park.

Theme songs

Ryan Cayabyab composed the official theme song of the 2019 Southeast Asian Games, which shares the name of the games' official slogan "We Win As One". Floy Quintos wrote the lyrics for the song, which was officially launched on July 11, 2019. Lea Salonga performed for the official release of theme song. The theme song and music video for "We Win as One" was formally released on September 3, 2019, at the Resorts World Manila. The music video which was shot at the New Clark City Sports Hub was directed by Shem Hampac and was produced by Equinox Manila.

Cayabyab originally made the composition of the song, with the expectation that 11 singers would do the official performance. The song was revised, in order to be more suitable for a solo performance, after Lea Salonga was tapped to do the performance. Cayabyab and Jimmy Antiporda were the ones responsible for the arrangement of the song.

Sarah Geronimo released "Who We Are", a legacy song for the workforce and volunteers of the 2019 Southeast Asian Games. The song was eventually played in several victory ceremonies with Filipino medalists. The music video was shot on several venues of the games.

Arnel Pineda and Filipino band KO Jones also released "Rock the SEA Games", which was also played during several SEA Games competitions, and was performed during the closing ceremonies on December 11, 2019.

In March 2020, "We Win as One" was remixed as "We Heal As One" in response to the 2020 coronavirus pandemic in the Philippines. Ryan Cayabyab also composed the song with new lyrics by Floy Quintos. The song was performed by various Filipino singers.

Official attire
Clothing for official use were designed for the games various use. The presenters of the games' victory ceremonies would be wearing attire inspired from Filipino traditional clothing namely the Balintawak dress, Barong Tagalog, and Baro't Saya. Color coded polo shirt and jacket were devised: For Southeast Asian Games Federation officials it was blue, for technical officials, green, for volunteers, red, and Philippine SEA Games Organizing Committee (PHISGOC) officials, navy blue. Business uniforms made by fashion designer Rajo Laurel will also be used. Laurel made two sets of uniform for women (black and white sets) and three sets for men (one black set and two white sets).

The Barong Tagalog was used as the official uniform for Team Philippines' parade in the 2019 SEA Games Opening Ceremony. The official uniform was designed by Francis Libiran, while the Filipino athletes' official training apparel is sponsored by Asics.

Sponsors
There were three tiers of sponsorship for the 2019 Southeast Asian Games, depending on the amount of funds a company contributes to the games; Preferred sponsors contributed , Gold sponsors contributed  and Platinum sponsors contributed . Philippine Airlines provided the air transport for the delegates of the games. Singapore-based Razer Inc. will be involved in the organization of the Esports events.

Six companies have sealed their partnership agreements with PHISGOC during the sponsorship signing ceremonies on February 13, 2019. Atos, an international company which is also the IT Partner of the Olympic and Paralympic Games, is designated as the official games management system provider. France-based GL events provided the overlays and temporary structures of the 39 sporting venues to be used for the 2019 SEA Games. Grand Sport, a sports apparel company from Thailand, is the official provider of the uniforms for the workforce, volunteers and technical officials. The official kits of the national athletes of the host country will be provided by ASICS. Mikasa, Marathon, and Molten are the providers of the official game balls and sporting equipment of the games, all brought in by Sonak Corporation. PHISGOC appointed MediaPro Asia as the official exclusive production, media rights, marketing and sponsorship agent of the games.

Autonomous vehicle (AV) service from United States-based COAST Autonomous was used to serve athletes and officials between the athletes' village, aquatic center and athletics stadium in New Clark City. This will be the first ever implementation of an AV service in a major sporting event.

SM Lifestyle, Inc., an arm of SM Prime Holdings, was named the regional games' official venue partner with the venue for men's basketball and ice hockey to be held in facilities managed by the SM Group.

Pennsylvania-based NEP Group was the official host broadcaster of the games which sold full and partial broadcasting rights to other broadcasters.
Skyworth was named as the official television partner in the games. They covered events prior to the competition proper including the torch relays in the Philippines and Malaysia, as well as the Game Hub and Fan Zones. The platinum-tier sponsorship was helped secured by Singapore firm Mediapro Asia.

Mastercard is the main sponsor of the games' official mobile app which would allow users to view the schedule and results as well purchase tickets and food in the venue.

The insurance plan covers death or any accident-related injuries incurred both during the games and in training, and losses due to sabotage and terrorist acts. Standard Insurance has EMA-Global as its medical service provider partner.

The Games

Opening ceremony

The Philippine Arena in Bocaue, Bulacan, the world's largest indoor arena, hosted the opening ceremony of the 2019 Southeast Asian Games. In the opening ceremony, Manny Pacquiao and Nesthy Petecio lit the cauldron in New Clark City. The lighting of the cauldron was not live and pre-recorded. It was initially planned to have conducted live but in anticipation of Typhoon Kammuri (Tisoy), a contingency had to be made. A separate cauldron was not built near the arena. Carlos Yulo was designated as the torch bearer and light the cauldron.

The opening ceremony was inspired from the opening ceremonies of the 2017 Southeast Asian Games in Kuala Lumpur, Malaysia, and the 2018 Winter Olympics in Pyeongchang, South Korea. Originally, the organizers announced plans to conduct a digital lighting of the flame during the event, but later added a backup plan for a "normal, traditional opening ceremony". The American entertainment company FiveCurrents, which produced the opening and closing ceremonies of the 2002 Winter Olympics, the 2007 Pan American Games and 2012 Summer Olympics, was hired to advise the local companies; Video Sonic and Stage Craft.

Filipino-American artist apl.de.ap, a member of The Black Eyed Peas, performed at the opening ceremony. Collaborating with Ryan Cayabyab, he performed a remix of his troupe's song rendered in Filipino traditional instruments and orchestral accompaniment. Previously the organizers negotiated with another Filipino-American artist, Bruno Mars, to do the same, but the negotiations did not advance. There were also expectations for performances by Filipino singer Lea Salonga and Journey lead singer Arnel Pineda, but they did not advance either, with Salonga declining due to an agenda conflict with the local production of the musical Sweeney Todd: The Demon Barber of Fleet Street.

Closing ceremony

The closing ceremony was held in the athletics stadium in New Clark City. The Black Eyed Peas as a group performed in the closing ceremony. Arnel Pineda and Filipino band KO Jones are also one of the performers.

Participating nations
All 11 members of Southeast Asian Games Federation (SEAGF) are expected to take part in the 2019 SEA Games. Below is a list of all the participating NOCs. 

 
 
 
 
 
 
 
  (host)

Sports
A record of 530 events in 56 sports have been approved to be contested at the 2019 Southeast Asian Games making this edition the largest Southeast Asian Games in terms of the number of sports and events contested.
An initial list of 32 sports to be contested at the 2019 Southeast Asian Games was agreed upon following the two-day SEA Games Federation Council Meeting from May 16 to 17, 2018 at the Shangri-La at the Fort in Bonifacio Global City, Taguig, Metro Manila. Badminton was initially excluded by the hosts from the initial list, but was reinstated following the objections of the National Olympic Committees of Malaysia, Indonesia, Myanmar, Singapore, and Thailand. Vovinam was later dropped from the finalized list of sports released by the organizers in mid-December 2018 and polo was included in January 2019.

The following is a list of sports to be contested at the games including partial figures for the number of events in each sport:

 Aquatics
 
 
 
 
 
 
 
 Baseball/Softball
 
 
 
 5x5 Basketball 
 3x3 Basketball 
 
 
 
 
 Canoeing/Kayak 
 Traditional boat race 
 
 
 BMX 
 Mountain biking 
 Road biking 
 
 
 
 
 
 
 
 
 Artistic 
 Aerobic 
 Rhythmic 
 
 Ice skating 
 
 
 Hockey
 
 
 
 
 
 
 
 Lawn bowls/Petanque 
 
 
 
 
 
 
 
 
 
 
 
 
 
 
 
 
 
 
 
 Tennis
 
 
 
 
 
 
 
 
 

In addition, the following will be demonstrations events:
 

The proposal to include additional sports was allowed through suggestions of the different NOCs until June 13, 2018. There was reportedly a provision that a proposed sport must be backed by at least four nations to be instated to the list. Among the sports proposed to be included in the final list are e-sports, netball, obstacle course, sambo, skateboarding, shuttlecock, surfing, water skiing, sports rock climbing, and aero sports Malaysia planned to propose the inclusion of tennis, ice skating and martial arts which featured in the previous edition while Cambodia lobbied for the inclusion of tennis, petanque, and vovinam.

On September 30, 2018, during a meeting at the SEA Games Council Federation headquarters in Bangkok. The NOCs of Southeast Asia approved 56 sports in total to be contested in the Games; all sports were proposed by the NOC of the host nation except the disciplines of floorball, vovinam, and indoor hockey which were lobbied for by the other NOCs.
Arnis, a Filipino martial art, was last featured as a demonstration sport in the 2005 edition. Arnis will be a regular sport in the 2019 games, and its national sport association lobbied for 20 events for the discipline (16 in combat; 4 in anyo) The Philippines will introduce 3x3 basketball for the first time in the history of the games.

Upon the approval of the 56 proposed sports, it was reported that no additional sports was to be added. However the Philippine Olympic Committee later announced that it would propose the addition of beach handball and beach netball after consultations with the sports' respective national associations to the final list of sports to be contested in the games to be agreed upon on November. Following a meeting of the Southeast Asian Games Federation Council from November 23 to 24, 2018, the approval of the 56 proposed sports were finalized with 530 events planned to be contested. The number of events was finalized by mid-December 2018.

Calendar

Several events were rescheduled due to inclement weather (without surfing).

Medal table

The 2019 Southeast Asian Games has 530 events in 56 sports, resulting in 530 medal sets to be distributed. Other additional number of medal sets that will be distributed, will be announced before the awarding of different sports in the games respectively.

The Philippines won 149 gold medals, 117 silver medals, and 121 bronze medals, finishing with their best finish yet on the games up to date.

Broadcasting

Key
 Host nation (Philippines)

Concerns and controversies 

The 2019 Southeast Asian Games was marred by a series of controversies, including corruption allegations, marketing and logistics problems, and poor treatment of delegates.

See also
Southeast Asian Games in the Philippines:
1981 Southeast Asian Games in Manila
1991 Southeast Asian Games in Manila
2005 Southeast Asian Games in Manila
 2020 ASEAN Para Games

References

External links
 
2019 Southeast Asian Games Results System

 
Southeast Asian Games by year
Southeast Asian Games
Southeast Asian Games
Southeast Asian Games
Multi-sport events in the Philippines
International sports competitions hosted by the Philippines
Sports in Metro Manila
Sports in Pampanga
Sports in Tarlac
Clark Freeport and Special Economic Zone
Southeast Asian Games
Southeast Asian Games